Pairote Puangchan   is a Thai retired footballer who played as a defender. He represented Thailand at the 1992 Asian Cup.

Personal life 
Pairote has a son, Thitiphan, who is also a national footballer.

External links

1966 births
1992 AFC Asian Cup
Living people
Pairote Puangchan
Place of birth missing (living people)
Pairote Puangchan
Association football defenders
Footballers at the 1990 Asian Games
Pairote Puangchan
Southeast Asian Games medalists in football
Competitors at the 1991 Southeast Asian Games
Pairote Puangchan
Pairote Puangchan